After the collapse of Lord Derby's minority government, the Whigs and Peelites formed a coalition under the Peelite leader Lord Aberdeen. The government resigned in early 1855 after a large parliamentary majority voted for a select committee to enquire into the incompetent management of the Crimean War. The former Home Secretary, Lord Palmerston, then formed his first government.

Cabinet

December 1852 – February 1855

† After June 1854 office became Secretary of State for War.

Notes

Lord John Russell served as Leader of the House of Commons from December 1852 to February 1855.

Changes
February 1853: Lord John Russell becomes Minister without Portfolio, remaining Leader of the Commons. Lord Clarendon succeeds him as Foreign Secretary.
June 1854: Lord Granville becomes Chancellor of the Duchy of Lancaster. Lord John Russell succeeds him as Lord President, remaining also Leader of the Commons. The Secretaryship of State for War and the Colonies is split up. The Duke of Newcastle stays on as Secretary of State for War, while Sir George Grey becomes Secretary of State for the Colonies.

List of ministers
Members of the Cabinet are indicated by bold face.

References
C. Cook and B. Keith, ''British Historical Facts 1830–1900'’

British ministries
Coalition governments of the United Kingdom
1850s in the United Kingdom
1852 establishments in the United Kingdom
1855 disestablishments in the United Kingdom
Ministries of Queen Victoria
Cabinets established in 1852
Cabinets disestablished in 1855